In game theory, and particularly mechanism design, participation constraints or individual rationality constraints are said to be satisfied if a mechanism leaves all participants at least as well-off as they would have been if they hadn't participated.

Unfortunately, it can frequently be shown that participation constraints are incompatible with other desirable properties of mechanisms for many purposes.

One kind of participation constraint is the participation criterion for voting systems. It requires that by voting, a voter should not decrease the odds of their preferred candidates winning.

See also
 Individual rationality
 Compensating variation

Mechanism design
Electoral system criteria